The Andean Information Network (Red Andína de Informacíón) or AIN is a Bolivian non-profit non-governmental organization founded in 1992 to raise awareness on the drug war and human rights, particularly in the coca-growing areas of Bolivia. The AIN publishes and distributes reports, including media analysis and independent studies which have been cited by many organizations, including the United Nations.

See also
 United States Agency for International Development

References

External links 
 
 Ledebur, K. and Youngers, C. 2013. From Conflict to Collaboration: An Innovative Approach to Reducing Coca Cultivation in Bolivia. Stability: International Journal of Security and Development 2(1):9.

Organisations based in Bolivia